Me'usharot (Hebrew: מעושרות; Wealthy Women ) was an Israeli reality television series which premiered on Channel 10 on October 24, 2011. The show is based on The Real Housewives, an American television franchise. The show features six different women, and focuses on their personal and professional lives.

Production
The series premiered in Israel on October 24, 2011. 22 episodes aired during the first season. After the first season finished airing, the series was canceled, but in 2012 it was picked up for a second season which was filmed in 2012 and premiered on May 4, 2013. 16 episodes aired during the second season. The third season had a revamped cast and integrated a male cast member into the cast. 15 episodes were aired during the third season. After the third season the show got cancelled on July 24, 2013.

Timeline of housewives

See also
Television in Israel

References

External links
 

Israeli reality television series
Wealth in Israel
Channel 10 (Israeli TV channel) original programming
2011 Israeli television series debuts
2013 Israeli television series endings